The Catastrophe is a 2011 short film directed by Chicago-based independent filmmaker and film studies instructor Michael Glover Smith, loosely based on the short story Mr. Higginbotham's Catastrophe by Nathaniel Hawthorne. The film had its world premiere at the Illinois International Film Festival on Saturday, November 19, 2011, where it won the award for Best Dramatic Short.

Plot
The Catastrophe is a surreal drama/mystery short film that uses dreamlike imagery, a Bob Dylan song and a poem by Forough Farrokhzad to paint a portrait of Dominicus Pike, the quintessential modern man. The movie follows Dominicus as he traverses the American midwest, plying his trade as a cigar salesman, and his dawning realization that he may have sold his soul to a multinational corporation.

The main story of The Catastrophe is interwoven with narrative threads involving the collapse of Dominicus’ relationship with his girlfriend, Carlie, and his discovery of what may be a murder plot involving one of his clients, Mohammad “Double Apple” Akbari. Only life on the road alone makes it hard for Dominicus to distinguish where reality ends and dreams begin.

History
The Catastrophe was shot on high definition digital video in 4 days in the late summer of 2011. Shooting locations included Chicago, Villa Park and Des Plaines, Illinois. Aside from lead actor Peyton Myrick, a North Carolina-based theatrical actor, most of the rest of the cast are well known in the worlds of Chicago music, theater, television and independent film; the cast includes noted thespians Mia Park (host of television's Chic-a-Go-Go), Marla Seidell, Suzy Brack, and Duane Sharp (star of Zen Noir). The Catastrophe is dedicated to imprisoned Iranian filmmakers Mohammad Rasoulof and Jafar Panahi.

References

External links
 
 

2011 films
American independent films
2011 independent films
2011 short films
2011 drama films
2010s English-language films
2010s American films